is a railway station in the city of Jōetsu, Niigata, Japan, operated by the third-sector operator Echigo Tokimeki Railway.

Lines

Station layout
The station has one side platform and one island platform connected by a footbridge.

Platforms

Adjacent stations

History
Takada Station opened on 15 August 1886. With the privatization of Japanese National Railways (JNR) on 1 April 1987, the station came under the control of JR East. From this date, Takada Station was transferred to the ownership of the third-sector operating company Echigo Tokimeki Railway.

Passenger statistics
In fiscal 2017, the station was used by an average of 2,342 passengers daily (boarding passengers only).

Surrounding area

 Takada Castle

See also
 List of railway stations in Japan

References

External links

 Echigo Tokimeki Railway Station information 
 Timetable for Takada Station 

Railway stations in Niigata Prefecture
Railway stations in Japan opened in 1886
Stations of East Japan Railway Company
Jōetsu, Niigata